Pietro Campagnari (born 15 May 1941) is an Italian racing cyclist. He rode in the 1971 Tour de France.

References

External links
 

1941 births
Living people
Italian male cyclists
Place of birth missing (living people)
Sportspeople from Verona
Cyclists from the Province of Verona